Keo Pich Pisey (born 17 May 1982) is a Cambodian actress, model, and former dancer.

She is best known for her portrayal of San Chhay in the F4 Cambodian film series. She has also appeared in karaoke DVDs and TV commercials since 2003 and she is considered one of the top Cambodian movie stars.

Some of her films are Tokchet Ovpuk (Father’s Heart), Ath Bey, Kong Kam Kong Keo, Ros Cheat Chivith, Domnok Cheam Chong Krouy, Samoth Tok Sap, and recently Pka Thkol Sor and Sromol Krom Pnek.

She is an incarnated angel of kampuchea krom, in the true story of Pok Phak Rop, author of ‘'The stream of a true story through my karma’’ (in khmer: Kamneut Chias Chivit Thmey, 2008, Ed. Angkor Phnom Penh, Cambodia).

Filmography

Television

References

External links
Modelling images of Keo Pich Pisey

Cambodian film actresses
Cambodian dancers
Cambodian female models
Living people
1982 births
People from Phnom Penh
Cambodian television actresses
21st-century Cambodian actresses
21st-century Cambodian women